Erik Jorgens de Menezes (born 18 February 2001), simply known as Erik, is a Brazilian professional footballer who plays as left back for Al Ain in UAE Pro League.

References

2001 births
Living people
Brazilian footballers
Brazilian expatriate footballers
Association football fullbacks
Campeonato Brasileiro Série A players
UAE Pro League players
Sport Club Internacional players
Al Ain FC players
Expatriate footballers in the United Arab Emirates
Brazilian expatriate sportspeople in the United Arab Emirates